Caterina Palazzi is an Italian double bass player. She's known as the leader of the Italian band Sudoku Killer, which plays jazz, psychedelic rock, and noise music. In 2010 she won the Jazzit Award as best italian jazz composer.
In 2022 she is mentioned as one of 20 best ever italian bassists on Rockit magazine.

Biography
Caterina Palazzi was born in Rome. She was the guitarist for the punk rock group the Barbie Killers. Beginning in 2000, she moved closer to jazz while attending the DAMS University (Arts, Music, and Show). From 2002 she attended the professional course at Saint Louis College of Music of Rome.

She is the leader and composer of the jazz/noise band Sudoku Killer, which released the albums Sudoku Killer (ZdM, 2010), Infanticide (Auand Records, 2015), "Asperger" (Clean Feed Records, 2018)

In 2010, she won the Jazzit Award for best Italian composer. The album Sudoku Killer won second best album and her band won fourth place.
From 2010–2015, she was named best new talent for the other important Italian jazz prize, TOP JAZZ, by Musica Jazz magazine.
In 2022 she is announced twelfth between 20 best ever italian bassists on Rockit magazine.

She has worked with Stefano Bollani, Gianluca Petrella, Roberto Gatto, Maurizio Giammarco, Mirko Guerrini, Israel Varela, and Luca Aquino.

She is the sister of photographer Michele Palazzi.

Discography

As leader
 2010 Sudoku Killer (Zone di Musica)
 2015 Infanticide (Auand)
 2018 Asperger (Clean Feed Records)

As guest
 2007 Lara Martelli, Cerridwen (Midfinger)
 2012 Stefano Scarfone, Precipitevolissimevolmente (Nau)
 2013 Neòs Trio, Neos Trio (Casa dell'Organetto)

References

External links
 Official site in Italian
 Label Official site in English
 Article at il Fatto Quotidiano in Italian
 Nominations on Rockit in Italian
 Article at Distorsioni in Italian
 Article at La Stampa in Italian
 Archived article in Italian

Jazz bass guitarists
1982 births
Living people
Musicians from Rome
21st-century bass guitarists
Clean Feed Records artists